Baldwin III (1088–1120) was count of Hainaut from 1098 to his death.

History
Baldwin was son of Count Baldwin II of Hainaut and Ida of Louvain. He succeeded to the County of Hainaut in 1102. Baldwin married Yolande of Guelders at a young age. He had been betrothed to Adelaide of Maurienne, a niece of Countess Clemence of Flanders. The broken betrothal caused a scandal, and Countess Clemence brought the issue before her brother Pope Calixtus II. The pope declared that the marriage was legal and could not be dissolved.

His eldest son, Baldwin IV, succeeded him. His younger son Gerard inherited the counties of Dodewaard and Dale, which had been in the possession of his mother. Countess Yolande held Hainaut as her dower for a while and as a regent for her son.

Family
He was married to Yolande, daughter of Count Gerard I of Guelders. Their children were:
 Baldwin IV, Count of Hainaut, married Alice of Namur
 Gerhard of Hainaut, ancestor of the Counts of Dale
 Gertrude/Ida of Hainaut, married before 9 August 1138 to Roger III of Tosny of Conches and Flamstead
 Richildis of Hainaut, married: 1) Thierry d’Avesnes; 2) Everard II Radulf, castellan of Tournai

After Baldwin's death, Countess Yolande married c.1120 Godfrey II, lord of Ribemont and Bouchain, castellan of Valenciennes and the son of Anselm of Ribemont. Yolande and Godfrey II had two children: 
 Godfrey III, castellan of Valenciennes
 Berthe of Valenciennes, who married 1) Count Otto II of Duras and 2) Guy de Saint-Aubert

See also
Counts of Hainaut family tree

References
Ancestral Roots of Certain American Colonists Who Came to America Before 1700, Frederick Lewis Weis (lines 98A-25, 163-25 160-23, 163-24, 163-26)

Footnotes

|-

House of Flanders
Baldwin III
1088 births
1120 deaths